Carmelo Rago Jr. (born 11 May 1986 in Canada) is a Canadian retired soccer player.

Career

At the age of 16, Rago played for Deportes Puerto Montt in Chile. However, he sustained stress fractures in both shins due to the artificial grass there, which prevented him from representing the Canada under-17 national team and achieving his goal to play in Italy.

Rago has two brothers, Antonio and Pasquale Rago, who are both soccer players.

References

External links
 Carmelo Rago at SoccerStats.us

Canadian soccer players
Living people
Association football forwards
1986 births
Edmonton Aviators / F.C. players